Korucuk is a village in the Seben District of Bolu Province in Turkey. Its population is 36 (2021).

References

Villages in Seben District